James Silas Calhoun (1802–1852) was best known as the Governor of New Mexico Territory from 1851 to 1852. He had many careers, though, including time as a Georgian politician, military officer, and bureaucrat in the United States government.

While in his thirties and forties, Calhoun served in a variety of political roles in his home state of Georgia. First, he was elected as a member of Georgia state legislature in 1830. Later, Calhoun became mayor of Columbus, Georgia from 1838 to 1839. Finally, he served in the Georgia state senate from 1838 to 1840 and again in 1845. In between his terms in the state senate, he also acted as the U.S. Consul in Havana, Cuba from 1841 to 1842.

Calhoun held the rank of lieutenant colonel in the US volunteers during the Mexican War. Following the war, Calhoun remained in the border region and held key positions with the U.S. government. First, the President appointed Calhoun the federal Indian Agent for the newly acquired territory of New Mexico. During his two-year tenure in that position, Calhoun used various tactics to convince or coerce Pueblo Native Americans to renounce their rights under the Treaty of Guadalupe Hidalgo as former Mexican citizens. Calhoun claimed that he only sought to "protect" the Pueblos from their Mexican-American neighbors by excluding them from territorial affairs. At that time in New Mexico, the argument that Pueblos were citizens (but denied the right to vote) was being used to remove any federal protection from their lands and water rights so they could be sold on the open market. The Pueblo agricultural lands and water rights were some of the best in the Territory. Federal action initiated by Calhoun led to the recognition of the Pueblos by the federal government with the issuance of the Pueblo Grants pursuant to the Treaty of Guadalupe-Hidalgo. Calhoun also negotiated a treaty with several Pueblos that Congress ultimately did not adopt, primarily due to Calhoun's premature death on a trip to Washington with a Pueblo delegation, and the subsequent federal action in 1854 recognizing the Pueblos and their lands.

President Millard Fillmore later appointed Calhoun as Governor of New Mexico Territory in 1851. One of his first acts as Governor was to propose laws restricting the movement of "free Negroes" into New Mexico. He garnered the support of wealthy Mexicans who feared for their own racial status in the U.S. Shortly after the end of his term as governor of the territory, Calhoun died of scurvy near Independence, Missouri, carrying his own coffin, while en route to Washington D.C. and eventually for his home in Georgia. He was buried in Kansas City, Missouri.

References

 
 

1802 births
1852 deaths
Governors of New Mexico Territory
Georgia (U.S. state) state senators
Mayors of Columbus, Georgia
Georgia (U.S. state) Whigs
19th-century American politicians
New Mexico Whigs
Deaths from scurvy
Burials in Missouri